Avudainathar Tempe is a Shiva Temple in Darasuram, Thanjavur district, Tamil Nadu, India.  மூலவர் ஆத்மநாதர் இலிங்க வடிவில் காட்சி தருகிறார்.

Location
The temple is located at Kammalar street in Darasuram in Kumbakonam-Thanjavur road. In the name board the temple name is mentioned as Avudainathar Kamatchi Amman Temple.

Two temples
In the campus two temples are found. They are Avudainathar temple and Kamatchi Amman temple.

Kamatchi Amman Temple

After entering through the main entrance balipeeda and nandhi are found. On either side of the sanctum sanctorum, Dvarapalais are found. In the sanctum sanctorum, Kamatchi Amman is found.

Avudainathar Temple

In the left side of Kamatchi Amman temple, Avudainathar Temple is found. The presiding deity is known as Avudainathar and Athmanathar. On either side Vinayaka and Subramania with Valli and Deivanai are found. On either side of the entrance Dvarapalas are found. On the right side of the sanctum sanctorum the shrine of Meenakshi Amman having nandhi and balipeeta are found. In the Kosta, Dakshinamurti, Lingodbava, Brahma and Durga and in the prakara Vinayaka Subramania with Valli and Deivanai and Bairava and the shrine of Chandikesvara and Navagraha are found.

Kumbakonam Sapta Stana Temple
This is one of the Saptha Stana Temples of Kumbakonam. During the Mahahaman of 2016 the palanquin festival was held on 7 February 2016. Following the tirttavari held at Mahamaham tank on 21 April 2016, the palanquin festival of the Sapta Stana Temples were held on 23 April 2016. The festival which started from Kumbesvara Temple at the 7.30 p.m. of 23 April 2016 completed on the morning of 25 April 2016 after going to the following temples.

 Adi Kumbeswarar Temple, Kumbakonam  
 Amirthakadeswarar Temple, Sakkottai  
 Avudainathar Temple, Darasuram 
 Kabartheeswarar Temple 
 Kottaiyur Kodeeswarar Temple 
 Kailasanathar Temple, Melakaveri
 Swaminatha Swamy Temple

References

Shiva temples in Thanjavur district